BS5 may refer to :
 BS5, a BS postcode area for Bristol, England
 BS5, a center drill bit size
 B-s5, a variant of the Antonov A-1 aircraft
 BS-V Bharat Stage emission standards in India
 BS 5 Report on Locomotives for Indian Railways, a British Standard